The Farman F.220 and its derivatives were thick-sectioned, high-winged, four engined monoplanes from Farman Aviation Works. Based on the push-pull configuration proven by the F.211, design started in August 1925 and the first flight of the prototype was on 26 May 1932. The largest bomber to serve in France between the two world wars was the final F.222 variant. One variation was intended to be an airliner.

Development
After testing the sole F.220 prototype, Farman made a number of changes to the design, including a new tail fin, fully enclosing the nose and ventral gunners' positions, and changing from V-engines to radials. The first example of this version, dubbed the F.221 flew in May 1933, and was followed by ten production examples delivered to the Armee de l'Air from June 1936. These machines featured hand-operated turrets for the three gunners' stations. Meanwhile, the prototype F.220 was sold to Air France, where christened Le Centaur, it flew as a mail plane on the South Atlantic route. This led to a batch of four similar aircraft being built for the airline.

The F.222 variant began to enter service with Armee de l'Air in the spring of 1937. Unlike its predecessor, this plane featured a retractable undercarriage. Twenty-four aircraft were produced with redesigned front fuselages and dihedral added to the outer wing. During World War II these planes were used in leaflet raids over Germany and then night bombing raids during May and June 1940. These resulted in three losses.

The Farman F.222 was involved in a notable operation carried out by French fighter pilot James Denis. On 20 June 1940, realising that the Battle of France was lost, Denis borrowed a Farman F.222 from an airbase near Saint-Jean-d'Angély. He flew to Britain with twenty of his friends, and joined the Free French Air Force, in which service he subsequently became an ace, shooting down nine German aircraft.

The F.223 (redesignated NC.223 when Farman was absorbed into SNCAC) incorporated significant changes, including a twin tail and a considerably refined fuselage. The first prototype was ordered as a long-range mail plane and in October 1937 established a record by flying 621 miles with a 22,046 lb payload. The Ministere d l'Air ordered a production run of 8 of the NC223.3 variation which was commenced in 1939. A variant NC 223.4 Jules Verne, a mail delivery plane converted back into a bomber after requisition at the star of World War II, of French Naval Aviation was the first Allied bomber to raid Berlin: on the night of 7 June 1940 aircraft of this variant dropped eight bombs of 250 kg and 80 of 10 kg weight on the German capital. This operation, which was of a primarily psychological-warfare nature, was repeated three days later.

The first NC 223.3 bombers were delivered in May 1940 and participated in night bombing attacks on Germany before being transferred to North Africa in June 1940. The bombers were subsequently relegated to transport roles, seeing service with both the Vichy regime and the Free French.

The F.224 was a dedicated civil variant able to seat 40 passengers. Six machines were produced for Air France, but were ultimately rejected because the 224 could not maintain altitude on three engines. The aircraft went on to serve in the Armée de l'Air instead with a reduced payload.

Variants
Farman F.220
Farman F.220.01 - prototype with Hispano-Suiza 12Lbr engines (1 built)
Farman F.220B - mailplane (converted from F.220)
Farman F.220-0 - production version of the F.220B (4 built)
Farman F.221
revised version with enclosed gunners' positions, powered by 4x Gnome-Rhône 14Kdrs engines, (10 built, plus one F.221.01 prototype).
Farman F.222
definitive production version
Farman F.222.1 - revised version with retractable undercarriage and turrets, powered by 4x Gnome-Rhône 14Kirs engines (11 built)
Farman F.222.01 prototype converted from the F.221.01
Farman F.222.2 - F.222.1 with redesigned nose, powered by 4x Gnome-Rhône 14N-11 engines, (24 built).
Farman F.2220 - airliner prototype for Air France as Ville de Dakar, powered by 4x Hispano-Suiza 12Xgrs engines, (1 built).
Farman F.223
version with twin tail and revised aerodynamics, 1,100 hp (820 kW) Hispano-Suiza 14AA-08 / Hispano-Suiza 14AA-09 engines
S.N.C.A.C. NC.223.1 - prototype, built as mailplane Laurent Guerrero (1 built)
S.N.C.A.C. NC.223.01 - bomber prototype with Hispano-Suiza 12Xirs engines (1 built)
S.N.C.A.C. NC.223.2 - bomber version with Gnome et Rhône 14N engines (not built)
S.N.C.A.C. NC.223.3 - bomber version with 910 hp (679 kW) Hispano-Suiza 12Y-29 engines (8 built)
S.N.C.A.C. NC.223.4 - mailplane version (3 built: Camille Flammarion, Jules Verne, and Le Verrier)
S.N.C.A.C. NC-2230 - A single postal transport powered by 4x Hispano-Suiza 12Xirs engines.
S.N.C.A.C. NC-2233 - A Bomber version of the F.233 powered by 4x Hispano-Suiza 12Y-29 engines, (15 built).
S.N.C.A.C. NC-2234 - Three airliners built for Air France, powered by 4x Hispano-Suiza 12Y-37 engines
Farman F.224
40-seat airliner with Gnome-Rhône 14N-01 engines for Air France but rejected (6 built)
Farman F.224TT - F.224s converted to troop transports for the Air Force.

Operators

Armee de l'Air
Air France
Aeronavale

Specifications (F.222/2)

See also

References

Notes

Bibliography

 Ketley, Barry, French Aces of WWII, Osprey Publishing

Further reading

 
 
 William Green, War Planes of the Second World War, Volume 8, 1967

1930s French bomber aircraft
F.0220
Four-engined push-pull aircraft
SNCAC aircraft
High-wing aircraft
Aircraft first flown in 1932